Birchrunville General Store is a historic general store located in West Vincent Township, Chester County, Pennsylvania.  It was built in 1898, and is a two-story, stone and frame, banked structure in a Late Victorian style. It has a mansard roof with fishscale slate and a jutting, short wooden bay window.  It was built to house a general store and post office, with a meeting hall above and creamery below.

It was added to the National Register of Historic Places in 1978.  It is located in the Birchrunville Historic District.

References

Commercial buildings on the National Register of Historic Places in Pennsylvania
Commercial buildings completed in 1898
Buildings and structures in Chester County, Pennsylvania
Historic district contributing properties in Pennsylvania
1898 establishments in Pennsylvania
National Register of Historic Places in Chester County, Pennsylvania
General stores in the United States